Reigning champion Mary Browne won the singles tennis title of the 1914 U.S. Women's National Singles Championship by defeating Marie Wagner 6–2, 1–6, 6–1 in the challenge round. It was Browne's third successive singles title. Wagner had won the right to challenge Browne by defeating Clare Cassel 6–3, 6–4 in the final of the All Comers' competition. The event was played on outdoor grass courts and held at the Philadelphia Cricket Club in Wissahickon Heights, Chestnut Hill, Philadelphia in the United States, from June 8 through June 13, 1914.

Draw

Challenge round

All Comers' finals

References

1914
1914 in women's tennis
June 1914 sports events
1914 in American women's sports
Women's Singles
Chestnut Hill, Philadelphia
1910s in Philadelphia
1914 in sports in Pennsylvania
Women's sports in Pennsylvania